The Luxor Apartments are a historic apartment building at 1923 Main Street in Little Rock, Arkansas.  It is a U-shaped two-story brick building, with sparse Craftsman styling that includes brackets on the shed roof over its main entrance.  It houses 28 small units, most of which retain original features such as Murphy beds, built-in china cabinets, and flooring.  When built in 1924, it was the largest apartment building in the city by square footage, and represented a rapid urbanization trend of the period.

The building was listed on the National Register of Historic Places in 1995.

See also
National Register of Historic Places listings in Little Rock, Arkansas

References

Residential buildings completed in 1924
National Register of Historic Places in Little Rock, Arkansas
Individually listed contributing properties to historic districts on the National Register in Arkansas
Apartment buildings on the National Register of Historic Places in Arkansas
1924 establishments in Arkansas